If You're Not in the Obit, Eat Breakfast is a 2017 American documentary film directed by Danny Gold that premiered on May 19, 2017 on HBO.

Premise
If You're Not in the Obit, Eat Breakfast follows Carl Reiner as he poses the question, "'What's the secret to living into your 90s – and loving every minute of it?' Reiner tracks down several celebrated nonagenarians, and a few others over 100, to show how the twilight years can truly be the happiest and most rewarding. Jerry Seinfeld — who’s already reserved the stage at Caesar’s Palace for his 100th birthday show — is also in the film, as is longevity expert Dan Buettner."

Persons featured

 Carl Reiner
 Iris Apfel
 Tony Bennett
 Alan Bergman
 Mel Brooks
 Dan Buettner
 Kirk Douglas
 Irving Fields
 Fyvush Finkel
 Stan Harper
 Ida Keeling
 Norman Lear
 Stan Lee
 Jim "Pee Wee" Martin
 Patricia Morison
 Raymond Olivere
 Tao Porchon-Lynch
 Estelle Reiner
 Jerry Seinfeld
 George Shapiro
 Harriette Thompson
 Dick Van Dyke
 Betty White

Production
On April 5, 2017, it was announced that HBO would premiere the documentary on June 5, 2017.

Release

Marketing
On May 12, 2017, the official trailer for the documentary was released.

Premiere
On May 17, 2017, the film held its official premiere at the Samuel Goldwyn Theater in Los Angeles, California. A question-and-answer session moderated by Tom Bergeron was held after the screening that included Dick Van Dyke, Carl Reiner, Mel Brooks, and Norman Lear.

Reception

Critical response
The film has been met with a positive response from critics since its premiere. On the review aggregation website Rotten Tomatoes, the series holds a 100% approval rating based on 6 reviews. Metacritic, which uses a weighted average, assigned the series a score of 81 out of 100 based on 4 critics, indicating "universal acclaim."

Awards and nominations

References

External links

2017 films
Documentary films about old age
HBO documentary films
American documentary films
2010s English-language films
2010s American films